Balakros, also Balacrus, the son of Nicanor, one of Alexander the Great's "Somatophylakes" (bodyguards), was appointed satrap of Cilicia after the Battle of Issus, 333 BC. He succeeded to the last Achaemenid satrap of Cilicia, Arsames.

Career
Balakros completed the conquest of Asia Minor together with Calas, satrap of Hellespontine Phrygia, and Antigonus, satrap of Phrygia.

It was probably this Balacrus who married Phila, the daughter of Antipater, and subsequently the wife of Craterus.

He was probably supervised by Menes from 331 BC, who held the position of Hyparch or Strategoi for the area from Babylon to the satrapies of Syria, Phoenicia, and Cilicia.

He fell in battle against the Pisidians in the lifetime of Alexander. His death is variously placed circa 328 BC or 323 BC.

Coinage
Balacrus is among several Hellenistic satraps who continued to use an Achaemenid type for their coinage, complete with the local deity of Tarsus, Baal. His coinage bore his name, and later only his initial "B". This coinage is said to have influenced Alexander's imperial coinage, which was initially minted in the same mints. The Imperial coinage of Alexander is often said to have been started in Tarsos circa 333–327, under the rule of either Balacrus or Menes.

References
Smith, William; Dictionary of Greek and Roman Biography and Mythology, "Balacrus (1)" , Boston, (1867)

Notes

Somatophylakes
Ancient Macedonian generals
Ancient Greek generals
Satraps of the Alexandrian Empire
4th-century BC deaths
4th-century BC Greek people
4th-century BC Macedonians
Year of birth unknown